Danielle "Hopi" Elizabeth Hoekstra (born 1972) is an evolutionary biologist working at Harvard University in Cambridge, Massachusetts. Her lab uses natural populations of rodents to study the genetic basis of adaptation. She is the Alexander Agassiz Professor of Zoology in the Department of Organismic and Evolutionary Biology and the Department of Molecular and Cellular Biology at Harvard University. She is also the Curator of Mammals at the Museum of Comparative Zoology and a Harvard College Professor. In 2014, Hoekstra became a Howard Hughes Medical Institute  Investigator. In 2016, she was elected to the National Academy of Sciences, and in 2017, she was elected to the American Academy of Arts and Sciences.

Early life
Hoekstra was born to a family of Dutch ancestry. Hoekstra's first name "Hopi" is derived from a Dutch term of endearment. Hoekstra attended a high school near Palo Alto, California. She chose to attend college at the University of California, Berkeley, where she initially intended to study political science. She chose the university because she wanted to play volleyball, which she did for two years. She has stated that at one point she wanted to become the U.S. ambassador to the Netherlands, but she was drawn into biology by a class on biomechanics taught by Robert J. Full. She went on to work in Full's lab, studying cockroach locomotion.

Career
Hoekstra received her B.A. in Integrative Biology from the University of California, Berkeley. Before her graduate studies, she researched grizzly bears for a year in Yellowstone National Park. She obtained her Ph.D. in Zoology as a Howard Hughes Predoctoral Fellow at the University of Washington.  For her postdoctoral work, she studied the genetic basis of adaptive melanism in pocket mice at the University of Arizona. In 2003, she became an assistant professor at the University of California, San Diego. In 2007, she moved to Harvard University, where she received tenure in 2010.
She is a member of the advisory board for Current Biology.

Research
Hoekstra is best known for studying the genetic mechanisms that influence the evolution of highly complex natural behaviors. In 2013, Hoekstra published an article in the journal Nature on the genetics of burrowing behavior in two sister species of Peromyscus mice; the oldfield mouse (P. polionotus), which builds elaborate burrows complete with an escape tunnel, and the deer mouse (P. maniculatis), which builds a simple and shallow nest. Using a combination of behavioral assays and classical genetic strategies, Hoekstra and her students identified four regions of DNA which control the length of the tunnels dug by the mice. Students in her lab have also studied the connections between digging behavior and the neurobiology of reward.

She has also studied the evolution of the color of mice coats and its significance for adaptation. In 2013, her team published an article in the journal Science, describing how coat color in mice was controlled by nine separate mutations within a single gene, named "agouti." Speaking about this discovery, Hoekstra said, "The question has always been whether evolution is dominated by these big leaps or smaller steps. When we first implicated the agouti gene, we could have stopped there and concluded that evolution takes these big steps as only one major gene was involved, but that would have been wrong. When we looked more closely, within this gene, we found that even within this single locus, there are, in fact, many small steps." Her work supports the hypothesis that evolution can occur through incremental changes. Recently, Hoekstra has found evidence linking the mutation the Agouti gene to survival in mice. The study showed how a sequence variant in the Agouti gene changes the phenotype and then linked those changes to changes in population allele frequency, demonstrating evolution of trait by natural selection.

Honors and awards
 2019 Awarded the Hart Merriam Award
 2018  Elected to the American Philosophical Society
 2017  Elected to the American Academy of Arts and Sciences 
 2016  Elected to the National Academy of Sciences
 2015  Richard Lounsbery Award, National Academy of Sciences
 2006  Beckman Young Investigator Award, Arnold and Mabel Beckman Foundation
 2003  Jasper J. Loftus-Hills Young Investigator Prize, American Society of Naturalists
 1998  Ernst Mayr Award, Society of Systematic Biologists

Family
Hoekstra lives in Cambridge, Massachusetts, with her son and her husband, James Mallet. Mallet is also an evolutionary biologist at Harvard.

Selected publications

References

1972 births
Living people
Harvard University faculty
Women evolutionary biologists
University of California, Berkeley alumni
University of Washington alumni
Members of the United States National Academy of Sciences
Howard Hughes Medical Investigators
Fellows of the American Academy of Arts and Sciences
Members of the American Philosophical Society
Richard-Lounsbery Award laureates
Scientific American people